Palazzo Mastelli del Cammello is a Gothic palace in Venice, Italy. It is located in Cannaregio district, on the Campo dei Mori and the Rio Madonna dell'Orto.

History
The building formerly belonged to three silk and spices merchant brothers (Rioba, Sandi, and Afani), who relocated from the Peloponnese to Venice around 1112 and then adopted the name Mastelli. They are traditionally associated with four statues of the three Moors and their servant on the Campo dei Mori. The initial construction of the palace dates back to the 12th century.

Architecture
The palazzo facade has three levels and is covered with gray stucco. The ground floor has a water portal flanked by lancet and arched windows. At the bottom right, there is a small fountain made in Arabian style, that, until a few years ago, was used to drink water while staying on the boat or gondola. The first noble floor has a trifora flanked by pairs of side windows. On its right side, the level is decorated with a bas-relef representing a turbaned man pulling a laden camel. It is this sculpture that gives its name del cammello to the palace. The level also has two paterae, one of them depicting a peacock. The left side window has a bit of Roman altar serving as a thick corner column. The second noble floor has a Gothic hexafora supported by a balcony on corbels and flanked by single-light side openings, also with balconies. The left balcony goes around the corner of the building. Quatrefoils, two of them irregular, decorate the top part of the hexafora.

The cornice is supported by small dentils decorated with animal heads. In the middle part of the roof there is a large dormer window. The windows, door frames, balconies, corbels, balusters, cornice, quatrefoils, and the relief of the camel are made of Istrian stone.

Gallery

References

Houses completed in the 14th century
Cannaregio
Gothic architecture in Venice